Królewskie (Polish for "royal") may refer to:
Królewskie, a brand of beer produced by Warka Brewery, a subsidiary of the Grupa Zywiec S.A.
Królewskie, Ostrzeszów County, a village in west-central Poland